The United States Academic Decathlon (USAD) is an American academic competition for high school students. The United States Academic Decathlon National Championship, first held in 1982, pits winners at the state level against each other for a national title. The Academic Decathlon consists of 10 events: art, economics, essay, interview, language and literature, math, music, science, social science, and speech. The Super Quiz replaces one of the seven objective events; since 2003, it has alternated between replacing science and social science. The Academic Decathlon requires participation from students of all levels of academic ability; teams generally consist of nine members, who are divided into three divisions based on grade point average: Honors (3.80–4.00 GPA), Scholastic (3.20–3.79 GPA), and Varsity (0.00–3.19 GPA). Though teams consist of nine members (three from each category), only the top two individuals from each category are counted in the final team score. Each student has the possibility of scoring up to 10,000 points, for a combined team score of 60,000.

At the national competition, Schools compete based on size and are divided into three divisions (I, II, and III). However, this separation is only limited to overall team score and overall individual score. Nine overall team medals are awarded: gold, silver and bronze for each division. Similarly, 27 overall individual medals are awarded: gold, silver and bronze for Honors, Scholastic, and Varsity in each division. The rest of the medals—for example, gold in art for Honors, or silver in math for Varsity—are awarded to the top scoring persons regardless of division. In addition, winning teams have often been invited to meet the President of the United States.

In April 1982, the first Nationals was held at Loyola Marymount University in California—16 states and the District of Columbia participated. However, the competition's founder, Dr. Robert Peterson, was inspired by the 1984 Summer Olympics in Los Angeles. He hoped to make Academic Decathlon an international event, and so at the 1984 Nationals, Canada, Mexico, and New Zealand fielded teams in addition to teams from 32 U.S. states. The inclusion of foreign countries did not become a regular occurrence, however. There was no more international participation until 1989, when teams from Northern Ireland and Rio de Janeiro competed. Since then, no more than a few teams a year have competed at Nationals. Since the first national event in 1982, only three states have ever won the National Competition: California, Texas, and Wisconsin, with California having won the majority of the National Competitions.The current National Champion is Granada Hills Charter High School from Granada Hills, California with the most wins consisting of nine national title.

In 2006, the small school virtual competition was created for schools with 650 or fewer students. Two years later, the medium school virtual competition was added to accommodate schools with a student population between 650 and 1300. In 2010, the virtual competition was expanded to include large schools by allowing the second-highest performing school in each state to compete in a large school e-Nationals. These contests are held via the internet and as such, the interview and speech events are excluded. The remaining eight tests are completed on the computer and results are submitted electronically to USAD for scoring. Because only the seven multiple choice tests and essay are used, team scores are out of 48,000 points instead of 60,000. Despite it being a virtual competition, winning schools are awarded trophies and medals for their efforts. According to USAD, the goal of the small and medium school competitions is to "enhance learning, growth and recognition" for more schools participating in Academic Decathlon.

National winners

References

External links 
 USAD – The official website of United States Academic Decathlon
 DDSIC – "Demidec Scores and Information Center" – A compilation of Academic Decathlon and Scholar's Cup scores

United States Academic Decathlon